(The) Flight of the Phoenix may refer to:
The Flight of the Phoenix, a 1964 novel by Elleston Trevor
 The Flight of the Phoenix (1965 film), an adaptation starring James Stewart
 Flight of the Phoenix (2004 film), a later adaptation
 "Flight of the Phoenix" (Arrested Development), an episode of Arrested Development
 "Flight of the Phoenix" (Battlestar Galactica), an episode of Battlestar Galactica
 "Flight of the Phoenix", a song by Grand Funk Railroad from Phoenix
 Flight of the Phoenix, a novel by Dave Wolverton
 The Flight of the Phoenix, a novel in the Death Merchant series by Joseph Rosenberger
 Flight of the Phoenix, a nickname of a B-50 Superfortress